A manuscript is the work that an author submits to a publisher, editor, or producer for publication. In publishing, "manuscript" can also refer to one or both of the following: 

 the format standard for a short story manuscript,
 an accepted manuscript, reviewed but not yet in a final format, distributed in advance as a preprint.

Manuscript format 

Even with desktop publishing making it possible for writers to prepare text that appears professionally typeset, many publishers still require authors to submit manuscripts formatted according to their respective guidelines. Manuscript formatting varies greatly depending on the type of work, as well as the particular publisher, editor or producer. Writers who intend to submit a manuscript should determine what the relevant writing standards are, and follow them.

Although publishers’ guidelines for formatting are the most critical resource for authors, style guides are also key references since "virtually all professional editors work closely with one of them in editing a manuscript for publication." Nonetheless, individual publishers' standards always take precedence over style guides.

As formatting of a short story is considered the most general rubric for manuscript submissions, it is referred to as the standard manuscript format and is easily distinguishable from most published material.

Preprint 

An ordinary manuscript only becomes a "publisher's preprint" if it somehow gets distributed beyond the authors (or the occasional colleague whom they ask for advice). A future "final print" must be planned – with better layout, proofreading, prepress proofing, etc. – that will replace the "preprinted manuscript". 

 In a peer review context: if an author prepares a manuscript on their computer and submits it to a publisher for review but it is not accepted, there cannot be a "publisher's preprint".
 In a web context (legal/cultural authorship): to demonstrate authorship, an author can upload a version of their work to a repository before full publication. Note that an alternative could be to use a legal deposit.

See also

 Center for Open Science
 Cogprints
 Cryptology ePrint Archive
 Draft document
 Grey literature
 List of academic journals by preprint policy
 Prepress
 Postprint
 ScientificCommons
 Self-archiving

References

Writing
Publishing
Academic journal articles
Academic publishing
Scientific documents
Publications by format
Grey literature